The ADC Theatre is a theatre in Cambridge, England, and also a department of the University of Cambridge. It is located in Park Street, north off Jesus Lane. The theatre is owned by the Cambridge University Amateur Dramatic Club (CUADC), but is currently run as the smallest department of the university, with four full-time and two part-time staff. It is a producing theatre with the CUADC as its resident company.

The auditorium seats 228 audience members. The auditorium seating was replaced in summer 2008, and the rows are fairly evenly stepped from row A up to row P (with entrances at row A – step-free from the street, via a passenger lift – and row J). The theatre has a bar, which opens 45 minutes before shows and often stays open until approximately 2am. The bar is famous for its cocktails themed around the current week's show.

History
When the CUADC was formed in 1855, its performances took place in rented rooms in the Hoop Hotel on Jesus Lane. By 1882, the club members had raised sufficient funds to buy the freehold. This building was subsequently developed into the ADC Theatre over an extended period of time. There was a disastrous fire in 1933, which gutted the building. The theatre was quickly rebuilt to a design by Harold Tomlinson and W. P. Dyson, reopening in 1935. The building was not changed again substantially until the redevelopment programme that started in 2002.

The theatre was run by the CUADC until the club ran into financial difficulties in 1974 when the University of Cambridge began to lease the premises from the CUADC and run the theatre, an arrangement that continues to this day.

Many famous actors and comedians acted in the theatre at the start of their careers, including Sir Ian McKellen, Tony Church, Emma Thompson, Marius Goring, Sir Derek Jacobi, Dan Stevens, Rebecca Hall, Stephen Fry, Hugh Laurie, Hattie Morahan, Tom Hollander, Tilda Swinton, Jan Ravens, Julie Covington, Tom Hiddleston, Eddie Redmayne, Richard Ayoade, Ellie Nunn, Liam Williams, David Mitchell, Robert Webb, Phil Wang, Simon Bird and Joe Thomas. Among famous directors to have gained early experience there are Sir Peter Hall, Sir Trevor Nunn and Sam Mendes. Viral comedian Ken Cheng performed multiple times at the ADC Theatre in his early career.

In 2011, the ADC Theatre took over the management of the Corpus Playroom, the theatre space of Corpus Christi College, Cambridge.

Redevelopment
In 2002, a redevelopment appeal was launched to improve the building. The bar had been refurbished in summer 2000, prior to the appeal being launched.

In summer 2003, the first phase of the redevelopment was undertaken. This phase resulted in no visible change to the theatre's facilities, as it consisted of necessary work to underpin the building and move services such as water and gas in preparation for the next phase.

In 2004, major modifications to the public areas of the theatre were undertaken. A new toilet block was constructed on an area that was part of the theatre's yard. A large amount of the ground floor was remodelled, resulting in an enlarged foyer and new box office for the public, and new management offices, clubroom, production office and backstage kitchen. The theatre's facade was also completely changed.

In summer 2005, a lift was installed to give disabled access to the bar and auditorium. In addition, a corridor was constructed to give audience access to both sides of the auditorium. A bar extension and bar roof terrace were constructed on top of the toilet block built in the previous phase. The installation of the lift meant that the previous ladder access to the lighting and sound boxes could no longer be used. The lighting and sound boxes were rebuilt to allow access to them from the lift.

A later phase, during the summer of 2008, concentrated on the backstage areas: new dressing rooms, a new set workshop, a soundproof rehearsal room, and a green room. Offices for the Theatre's full-time staff and resources for those producing shows were rearranged and expanded. Additionally, the auditorium floor was rebuilt and new seating installed, increasing audience comfort and providing a better view of the stage from all seats.

The Theatre reopened after the final phase in October 2008 with a Gala Celebration event, at which a number of theatre alumni were present including Peter Hall and Trevor Nunn.

In the summer of 2018, the theatre again closed for renovations. Air conditioning and new seating were installed in the auditorium, a small extension was made to office space, and additional points for rigging lights were installed.

Shows
During the term-time of Cambridge University, there are normally two shows per night: a Mainshow starting at 7:45 pm, and a Lateshow starting at 11 pm. On Tuesdays, the late slot is normally filled by a one-night show that can range from comedy (such as Smokers produced by the Cambridge Footlights) to "fringe" drama such as original writing. This format is subject to change, and notably performances often take place in the theatre bar on Sunday evenings.

Outside term-time, the theatre often holds one show per week, and closes for periods during the summer and, to a lesser extent, the Christmas and Easter holidays. These closures allow essential maintenance work to be undertaken in the theatre.

Groups that frequently use the theatre
During term-time, Cambridge University drama societies such as CUADC, Footlights and CUMTS use the theatre, as well as college drama societies.

Outside term-time, the theatre is typically used by drama societies based in the city of Cambridge such as BAWDS, the Combined Actors of Cambridge and WriteOn.

References

External links
 ADC Theatre website
 CUADC website
 BAWDS website
 Combined Actors website
 WriteOn website

1881 establishments in England
Theatres in Cambridge
Non-School institutions of the University of Cambridge
Student theatre in the United Kingdom